Kalmoohi  (Urdu:کلموہی) is a 2014 Pakistani drama serial Written by  Ibn e Aas Muhammad and directed by Syed Atif Hussain aired on Geo TV on Wednesday and Thursday nights at 9:00 p.m. First episode was aired on 21 November 2013. Serial is written by Ibn-e-Aas and produced by A & B Production. Serial stars Maria Wasti, Moammar Rana, Badar Khalil in lead roles.

Plot
This serial is about an orphan (yateem larki) Husna who lives with her step mother and step siblings and face hardships in her life. They called her Kallu because of her color complexion and treat her like a servant. They beat her and made life difficult for that innocent girl.

Cast 

Maria Wasti as Husna
Badar Khalil as Husna's grandmother
Moammar Rana 
Ghazala Butt as Shakeela
Qavi Khan
Faizan Khawaja
Maheen Rizvi
Sadia Ghaffar
Hannan Sameed
Saleem Mairaj
Afshan Qureshi as Nushaba
Hina Rizvi as Khairan	
Hira Shaikh as Mehru

References

External links 
 Kalmoohi- Geo Entertainment official site

Pakistani television series